Julia Chung Pau-choo is a Taiwanese electrical engineer.

Chung earned a bachelor's degree in electrical engineering from National Cheng Kung University in 1981, followed by a master's degree in the same subject in 1983. She subsequently graduated in 1991 from Texas Tech University with a doctorate, and accepted a faculty position at NCKU in 1996. Chung was elevated to a distinguished professorship in 2005. In 2008, Chung was elected a fellow of the IEEE. Chung was a founding member of Women in Circuits and Systems in 2008, a subcommittee sanctioned by the board of governors of the IEEE Circuits and Systems Society, and served as its founding chair until 2009.

References

Taiwanese electrical engineers
Academic staff of the National Cheng Kung University
National Cheng Kung University alumni
Texas Tech University alumni
Living people
20th-century Taiwanese engineers
21st-century Taiwanese engineers
Taiwanese women engineers
Taiwanese expatriates in the United States
Year of birth missing (living people)
Fellow Members of the IEEE
20th-century women engineers
21st-century women engineers